Äitei, known as Internatsional until 1992, is a village in the Karasay District of the Almaty Region in Kazakhstan. It is located about 5 km northwest of Kaskelen.

References 

Populated places in Almaty Region